Ahmad Qavam (2 January 1873 – 23 July 1955), also known as Qavam os-Saltaneh, was a politician who served as Prime Minister of Iran five times.

Early life 
Qavam was born in 1873 to a prominent Persian family with origins in Ashtian. His uncle, Amin Aldoleh, was a Prime Minister of Iran. Hasan Vossug, another Prime Minister, was his older brother. Qavam served in the royal court of Nasereddin Shah early in his career and obtained the title os-Saltaneh during the Constitutional Revolution of Iran in 1909.  The letter signed by Mozaffaredin Shah in acceptance of the Constitutional Revolution was written by Qavam, who had the title of Dabir-e Hozoor (Private Secretary) at the time. Qavam became Prime Minister several times during both the Qajar and Pahlavi dynasties. Twice he played a significant role in preventing the USSR from annexing Iran's northern provinces.

Political career

Qavam was appointed governor of Khorasan Province in 1918, during which time he responded to the ongoing famine and the Spanish flu pandemic. He was a hardliner administrator and banned some of the newspapers which had been published in the region.

In 1921, during the coup d'état of Tehran against the Qajar government, Tabatabaee ordered Colonel Pessian to arrest many of the opposition, among them Ahmad Qavam.

However, with the fall of Tabatabaee's government and the refusal by Mostowfi ol-Mamalek and others to accept the position of Prime Minister due to the unstable political situation, Qavam, just released from the Ishratabad prison of Tehran, was offered the position. He accepted and became Prime Minister in circumstances so unusual that Iraj Mirza wrote the following verses:

یکی را افکند امروز در بند
کند روز دیگر او را خداوند

"One day in prison he is thrown,another day the King's chair he'll own"

Qavam in fact ordered the arrest of Seyyed Zia'eddin Tabatabaee in an incident 25 years later. He also ordered the crackdown on the revolt of Colonel Pessian which he crushed with the aid of Reza Pahlavi.

Of the major events that occurred during his terms as the Prime Minister, was his invitation to Arthur Millspaugh for assisting the government in its finances. Another was the riots of 1942 for economic hardship. He appointed Sepahbod Ahmad Amir-Ahmadi to restore order and end the riots, which he did forcefully. Qavam was also instrumental in the 1942 Tripartite Treaty between Iran, Russia, and Britain.

He was again voted Prime Minister on 26 January 1946 with a slim margin in the Majlis of 52–51. The Majlis thought he would have the best chance of resolving the Soviet-inspired rebellion of the occupied Azerbaijan province since Qavam was the largest property owner in the region. Qavam did not disappoint. He ordered the Iranian delegation to the UN to negotiate issues pending before the Security Council directly with the Soviet delegation. He then flew to Moscow to discuss the issues personally with Stalin.

When the Soviets violated the terms of the Tripartite Pact which called for all foreign military forces to be withdrawn from Iranian territory by 2 March 1946, it drew a strong rebuke from Parliamentary Whip, Mohammed Mossadegh.

Qavam arranged a deal with the Soviets, granting an oil concession in the North contingent on the approval of the Majlis after the elections. Under the terms of the agreement with Qavam, Soviet troops began withdrawing from Iran. When the new Majlis was seated, they immediately voted against the proposed Soviet oil concession. This earned Qavam the congenial title, "The Old Fox". It also caused significant opposition against him led by Atesh and its editor Mehdi Mir Ashrafi and Mard-i Imruz and its editor Mohammad Masud who publicly argued that Qavam should be killed due to the oil deal with the Soviets.

Death
Qavam died at the age of 82 in 1955 in Tehran. He was survived by his second wife and his only son, Hossein.

See also

Pahlavi Dynasty
List of prime ministers of Iran
Reza Shah
Mohammad Reza Shah
Abdolhossein Teymourtash
Ali Akbar Davar
Mirza Javad Khan Ameri

References

Other sources
T'Alí Rizā Awsatí. (2003). Iran in the Past Three Centuries (Irān dar Se Qarn-e Goz̲ashteh), Volumes 1 and 2 (Paktāb Publishing, Tehran, Iran, 2003).  (Vol. 1),  (Vol. 2).
Hamid Shokat. (2006). Dar Tir Rase Hadese, The political life of Qavam osSaltaneh. Tehran,  .  Published by akhtaranbook (www.akhtaranbook.com)

External links

1873 births
1955 deaths
People from Gilan Province
Prime Ministers of Iran
Politics of Qajar Iran
Democrat Party of Iran politicians
Reformers' Party politicians
Mostowfian Ashtiani family
20th-century Iranian politicians
People of Qajar Iran
Politicians from Tehran
People of Pahlavi Iran